Konstantin Sardzhev (born 17 April 1943) is a Bulgarian modern pentathlete. He competed at the 1968 Summer Olympics.

References

External links
 

1943 births
Living people
Bulgarian male modern pentathletes
Olympic modern pentathletes of Bulgaria
Modern pentathletes at the 1968 Summer Olympics
Sportspeople from Sofia